Andrew Kane may refer to:
Andrew Gardiner Kane (born 1947), former Unionist politician in Northern Ireland
Andrew Cane ( 1602–1650), also Kayne, Kene, Keine, and other variants, English comic actor
Andy Kane, "Handy Andy", British TV presenter
Andy Kane (footballer), Scottish footballer with Clyde, Stranraer and Parramatta Eagles